Matrix metalloproteinase-23 is an enzyme that in humans is encoded by the MMP23B gene.

== Function ==
This gene (MMP23B) encodes a member of the matrix metalloproteinase (MMP) family, and it is part of a duplicated region of chromosome 1p36.3. Proteins of the matrix metalloproteinase (MMP) family are involved in the breakdown of extracellular matrix in normal physiological processes, such as embryonic development, reproduction, and tissue remodeling, as well as in disease processes, such as arthritis and metastasis. This gene belongs to the copy of the duplicated region of the gene that is closer to the end of the chromosome (more telemeric).

MMP23B is strongly expressed in ovary and heart.

References

Further reading

External links
 The MEROPS online database for peptidases and their inhibitors: M10.022

Matrix metalloproteinases